Jürgen Schulz (born 6 October 1952) is a retired German footballer.

Schulz played a record 244 games (67 of which in the Fußball-Bundesliga) for Tennis Borussia Berlin between 1973 and 1981, scoring 16 goals.

References 
 

1952 births
Living people
German footballers
Association football midfielders
Bundesliga players
2. Bundesliga players
Tennis Borussia Berlin players